The Nanu Oya railway station is the 63rd station on the Main Line, and is  away from Colombo. All trains including Podi Menike and Udarata Menike express trains service the station. The station was a junction and branching point for the Udupussallawa narrow gauge railway line connecting Nanu Oya with Ragala via Nuwara Eliya. 

The original train station was built in 1885 as the terminus of the main line, as part of the  rail line connecting Hatton to Nanu Oya. In 1893 the railway line was extended from Nanu Oya to Bandarawela and in 1903 the station became a junction station when Udupussallawa railway line was constructed. In 1948 the government decided to close the Udapussellawa railway due to low traffic and the tracks were completely removed.

Continuity

See also 
List of railway stations in Sri Lanka
List of railway stations in Sri Lanka by line
Sri Lanka Railways
Nuwaraeliya

References 

Railway stations in Nuwara Eliya District
Railway stations on the Main Line (Sri Lanka)
Railway stations opened in 1885